A Girl's Tears is a 1980 Romanian drama film directed by Iosif Demian. It was screened in the Un Certain Regard section at the 1982 Cannes Film Festival. It tells the story of a young girl's murder and how it changed the lives of the inhabitants of a Transylvanian village.

Cast
 Anton Aftenie
 George Bussun
 George Negoescu
 Lujza Orosz
 Mihai Oroveanu
 Dragos Pîslaru
 Dorel Vişan as Maiorul

References

External links

1980 films
1980 drama films
1980s Romanian-language films
Films directed by Iosif Demian
Romanian drama films